Veľký Klíž is a village and municipality in Partizánske District in the Trenčín Region of western Slovakia.

History
In historical records the village was first mentioned in 1230.

Geography
The municipality lies at an altitude of 250 metres and covers an area of 42.405 km2. It has a population of about 916 people.

References

External links

 
https://web.archive.org/web/20070513023228/http://www.statistics.sk/mosmis/eng/run.html

Villages and municipalities in Partizánske District